The 2014 Paris Municipal elections took place on 23 and 30 March 2014, at the same time as other French municipal elections.

Anne Hidalgo of the Socialist Party was elected mayor of Paris, becoming the first woman to hold that position. She had been the city's deputy mayor.

Hidalgo won with around 55% of the vote in the second round. Her principal opponent was Nathalie Kosciusko-Morizet of the UMP who had finished ahead of Hidalgo in first round of voting on 23 March. Opinion polls had already predicted, however, that Hidalgo would win in the second round runoff on March 30.

The outgoing mayor was the Socialists' Bertrand Delanoë, who did not run for a third term.

Control of Paris' twenty arrondissements was also decided in the elections. Ten were won by the Socialist Party, nine by the UMP and one by EELV.

Detailed Results

See also 
List of Paris' councillors (2014-2020)

References

2014 elections in France
Municipal elections in France
2014 in Paris
Elections in Paris
March 2014 events in France